Zael is a municipality in the province of Burgos, Castile and León, Spain.

Municipalities in the Province of Burgos